"A Brush with the Law" is the eleventh episode of the fifth series of the British comedy series Dad's Army. It was originally transmitted on 15 December 1972.

Synopsis
Mainwaring is charged with showing a light, contrary to blackout rules, and is taken to court by a cheerful ARP Warden Hodges. As if that was not enough, the magistrate is none other than his old nemesis Captain Square. The Verger tries to warn off Hodges, but Hodges will not back down.

The platoon tries to help by testifying as witnesses to Mainwaring's innocence, but things go from bad to worse when Jones messes up his story under oath. As both Square and Hodges proceed to push Mainwaring towards what could be a sticky end, Walker steps in and reveals he was out delivering 'supplies' to a 'nearby customer', putting some pressure on Square by reminding him of his own illegal activities buying blackmarket whisky.  Just as Square is about to dismiss the trial, the Verger confesses it was he who showed the light, having used the office after the platoon had left on patrol to write his memoirs, much to the fury of Hodges who has lost his chance to end Mainwaring.

The case is dismissed and Mainwaring is allowed to leave the court "without a stain on his character". He attributes his acquittal to "honesty, fair play and the integrity of British justice".

Cast

Arthur Lowe as Captain Mainwaring
John Le Mesurier as Sergeant Wilson
Clive Dunn as Lance Corporal Jones
John Laurie as Private Frazer
James Beck as Private Walker
Arnold Ridley as Private Godfrey
Ian Lavender as Private Pike
Bill Pertwee as ARP Warden Hodges
Geoffrey Lumsden as Captain Square
Frank Williams as The Vicar
Edward Sinclair as The Verger
Stuart Sherwin as Junior Warden Reg Adamson
Jeffrey Gardiner as Mr Wintergreen
Marjorie Wilde as Lady Magistrate
Chris Gannon as Mr Bone, the Clerk of the Court
Toby Perkins as Usher

Notes
Mainwaring is prosecuted under the Emergency Powers (Defence) Act 1939, which had been rushed onto the statute book by the government under public pressure. Under its rules, Mainwaring could have been sentenced to several months in jail had he been found guilty as charged.
After Mainwaring is proved innocent Pike says "it's just like that film with John Garfield", a reference to the 1939 film They Made Me a Criminal.
After the recording of this episode, the regular cast recorded the special sketch "Broadcast to the Empire" which was transmitted as part of the 1972 Christmas Night with the Stars on BBC1.

References
 Dad's Army: The Complete Scripts

Dad's Army (series 5) episodes
1972 British television episodes